The Mayo Performing Arts Center (MayoPAC) is a nonprofit multi-use performing arts center located in Morristown, New Jersey, United States.

History  

The Community Theatre was built in 1937 and was once the crown jewel of Walter Reade's chain of movie theatres in New Jersey, opening on December 23, 1937, with the David O. Selznick film, Nothing Sacred. By the 1980s, the Theatre had fallen into disrepair and sat idle for nearly a decade.

In 1994, the Theatre reopened as a performing arts center with a gala performance featuring the Kirov Orchestra and pianist Alexander Slobodyanik.

In 2007, major renovations including the installation of an air conditioner enabled the venue to be open year round. A Liza Minnelli performance celebrated the reopening.

The upstairs balcony was renovated in 2011, with new restrooms, Art Gallery space and concessions.

In May 2011, the Theatre officially changed its name to Mayo Performing Arts Center, completing a three-year transition, honoring the leadership of Bud Mayo.

Notable Acts 

Music:

 38 Special
 Air Supply
 Trey Anastasio
 Paul Anka
 Adam Ant
 America
 The Beach Boys 
 Tony Bennett
 Blue Oyster Cult
 Jackson Browne 
 Peter Cetera
 Judy Collins
 Chick Corea and Bela Fleck 
 Christopher Cross
 Blues Traveler
 Boy George and Culture Club
 Dion
 Micky Dolenz
 Melissa Etheridge
 Foreigner
 Aretha Franklin
 Kenny G
 Art Garfunkel
 Arlo Guthrie
 Herman's Hermits
 Bruce Hornsby
 Engelbert Humperdinck
 Chris Isaak
 Boney James 
 Jefferson Starship
 B.B. King
 Gladys Knight
 Darlene Love
 The Manhattan Transfer
 Mannheim Steamroller
 The Marshall Tucker Band
 Meat Loaf (Nov 25 1977)
 Randy Newman
 The Oak Ridge Boys
 Joan Osborne
 Donny and Marie Osmond
 Bernadette Peters
 The Righteous Brothers
 Leann Rimes
 Linda Ronstadt
 Todd Rundgren
 Trombone Shorty
 Mavis Staples
 Ringo Starr and His All Starr Band
 Ruben Studdard
 Peter Tork
 Rob Thomas
 Three Dog Night
 Brian Wilson
 "Weird Al" Yankovic
 Yanni
 Dwight Yoakam
 Dweezil Zappa

Stand-Up

 Louie Anderson
 Dave Attell
 Lewis Black
 Wayne Brady
 Jim Breuer
 Cheech & Chong
 Andrew Dice Clay
 Craig Ferguson
 Kathy Griffin
 Jay Leno
 Howie Mandel
 Norm Macdonald
 Tracy Morgan
 Kevin Nealon
 Bob Newhart
 Jackie Mason
 Hasan Minajh
 Jeff Ross
 Rita Rudner
 Bob Saget

Theater:

 RENT
 Stomp
 Wizard of Oz
 Elf the Musical
 Monty Python’s Spamalot
 Rodgers + Hammerstein’s Cinderella
 Reduced Shakespeare Company
 The Sound of Music Live!
 The Producers
 Ragtime the Musical
 Joseph and the Amazing Technicolor Dreamcoat
 The Mikado
 Mamma Mia!
 Evil Dead the Musical
 A Chorus Line

Speakers:

 Temple Grandin
 Deepak Chopra
 Dr. Drew Pinsky
 Drew Carey
 Anderson Cooper
 Cesar Millan
 David Sedaris
 Jane Fonda
 James Van Praagh
 John Kerry
 Rob Lowe

Tribute acts:

 Beatles
 Roy Orbison Hologram Tour
 Queen
 the Rat Pack
 Simon & Garfunkel

Special events:

 Big Apple Circus  
 The Nutcracker by the New Jersey Ballet
 Price is Right Live!
 Whose Live Anyway?

Transportation 
A New Jersey Transit bus stop is located adjacent to the theatre.  The theatre is approximately 0.3 miles from Morristown station.

References

External links

Theatres in New Jersey
Concert halls in New Jersey
Event venues established in 1937
Buildings and structures in Morris County, New Jersey
Morristown, New Jersey
Performing arts centers in New Jersey
Tourist attractions in Morris County, New Jersey
1937 establishments in New Jersey